La Chiquinquirá Church may refer to several churches in Venezuela and Colombia:

 La Chiquinquirá Church (Caracas)
 La Chiquinquirá Church (Maracaibo)